Karnana or  Akhtar Karnana is a town and Union Council 73rd of Gujrat District in the Punjab Province of Pakistan and has a population of over 20000, It is located at 32°39'35"N, 73°52'0"E and has an altitude of 233 metres (767 feet).

History of the region 

After the decline of the Mughal Empire, the Sikhs invaded and occupied Gujrat District. During the period of British rule, Hafiz Ghulam Muhammad Ch. was a landlord. He was a political religious spiritual and herbal practitioner of Karnana. Hafiz had helped and defended poor Karnanians against powerful Hindu Khuttri Gujrat District who had increased in population and importance.

After the division of the subcontinent in 1947, the minority Hindus and Sikhs migrated to India and Muslim refugees from India settled in the Gujrat District. Now mainly Muslim families live in Akhtar Karnana.

Geography 
On the north side of the village is the Lalamusa-Dinga link road, connecting it to these two nearest cities.

On the east side are the small villages of Lambor, Bhola, Umar Chak, & Jalaldin, and Lalamusa City & Sukh Chainah a little north.

In the north are Ban Kalas aka Bani & Bashna.

Rakdand, Miana Chak, Jaura, Ghurko, Dhola, Pir Jand and mainly Dinga City are in the west. In the south are Chechian, Ranian & Paal.

Transportation 
Shorkot–Lalamusa Branch Line of Pakistan Railways passes through Akhtar Karnana railway station, linking Lalamusa, Dinga, Mandi Bahauddin, bhalwal, sargodha and shorkot.

Via Pakistan Railways Akhtar karnana is connected to Peshawar-karachi .

Ch Akhtar Ali Karnana and Muhammad Munir Mughal had constructed this railway station  in 1984, and are still taking care of it, even though the train service is available.

Nowadays people prefer to travel on rickshaws or their personal vehicles. 
Besides, Lalamusa-Dinga Link road connects Karnana to many villages.

Religious / Islamic Places 

There are approximately 14 Mosques, 2 of them are not yet constructed.

Mosques

Grand (Jamia) Mosques 
 Central Mosque
 Al- Madina Mosque
 Quba Mosque

Other Mosques 
 Ghosia Al-Rehmat Mosque
 Habib Mosque
 Husnain Tayyaban Mosque
 Ali Mosque
 Abu-Bakr Siddque Mosque
 Noor Mosque
 Mustafa Mosque
 Nasib Mosque (work in progress)
 Mosque of High School

Islamic Educational Places

Education

List of Schools

Government Schools 

 Govt. Boys High School Karnana
 Govt. Boys Primary School Karnana
 Govt. Girls Elementary School Karnana

Private Schools* 
 The Educators (Abdul Shakoor campus)
 Noor Public Girls Model High School Karnana 
 Kinza Public Girls High School Karnana
 Mustafai Public Girls High School

*(There might be others, but these are the better known)

Families and caste system 
Ch. Akhtar Ali Khatana is a personality of Karnana. Ex. Chief Minister of Punjab Mian Afzal hayat's forefathers from the Mian Family were from Karnana as well. Everyone in Karnana is attached to some family. Although it has no influence on daily life, it gives an identity to the individual. Families could be divided into two groups, by their collective wealth and power: Zamindar and Kammi.

There are many families, including the surnames 
BAHRWAL,Bhalot,Bajaar, Chechi, 
Gorsi, Jeendhar,Khatana, Koli,
Meemla,Miana,Porh, Theekrya,Thola 
Pariah, Thola,Mughals, Bhatti,
Rajpoot, Malik,Awan, Ansari, 
Qureshi, Muslim Sheikh, and Chauhan.

See also
Chachian ranian

References 

Populated places in Gujrat District